The following lists events that happened during 2008 in the Republic of Azerbaijan.

Incumbents
 President: Ilham Aliyev
 Prime Minister: Artur Rasizade
 Speaker: Ogtay Asadov

Events

January

February

March

April
April 12 - Baku hosted the 1st Qualifying Tournament in Women's field hockey Qualifyings for the 2008 Summer Olympics.

May
May 24 – Azerbaijani duet Elnur Hüseynov and Samir Javadzadeh finishes 8th at the final of the Eurovision Song Contest 2008.

June
June 26 - The Azerbaijani Armed Forces celebrates its 90th anniversary.

July

August
August 9 - The 17th season of Azerbaijan Premier League has started.

September
September 17 - The Premiliary Round of Azerbaijan Cup 2008–09 has started.

October
October 15 - Presidential election took place with Ilham Aliyev being re-elected.

November

December

Sport
8 August to 24 August – Azerbaijan competes in the 2008 Summer Olympics in Beijing, China. The Azerbaijani Olympic team wins 14 gold medals, coming 6th on the medal tally.

Deaths
 March 5 – Hajibey Sultanov, Azerbaijani astronomer (born 1921)
 October 25 – Muslim Magomayev, Azerbaijani singer (born 1942)

References

 
Azerbaijan
Azerbaijan
Azerbaijan